Lelenchus is a genus of nematodes belonging to the family Tylenchidae.

The genus has almost cosmopolitan distribution.

Species:

Lelenchus brevislitus 
Lelenchus filicaudatus 
Lelenchus leptosoma 
Lelenchus schmitti

References

Nematodes